The Arboricultural Association is the largest body in the UK for the amenity tree care professional (arboriculturalists).

Structure
There are over 3000 Arboricultural Association members and the trade body is recognised by local Government, the RHS and increasingly the general public as the focal point for best practice in arboriculture. It has a membership program linked to the Qualifications and Credit Framework. It is represented on a number of national bodies including the Tree Council. It is a registered charity, charity number 1083845.

It is situated on the B4008 in Stroud Green, north of Stonehouse.
The address is The Malthouse, Stroud Green, Standish, Stonehouse, Gloucestershire GL10 3DL.

Function

The Arboriculture Association continually strives to raise awareness of the importance of urban and amenity trees and gives a voice to everyone working within the wide and varied industry. Working with the Arboriculture Association allows the progression of the disciplines of arboriculture and makes the villages, towns and cities of the UK greener.
Membership with the AA provides support and benefits which are tailored to the members' needs as they progress through a career in arboriculture. Members have access to a wide range of benefits, along with the opportunity to get involved with the key developments and decisions in the industry and make their voices heard.

History
The AA was founded in 1964 as a scientific and educational organisation, keen to promote the care and value of trees in no forest settings. The passion for trees shown by the founders at that time continues to exist in the Board and members today.

Following initial discussions between Keith Ross, Don Wells and other interested parties, the Arboricultural Association was formed, and in the same year the Association of British Tree Surgeons and Arborists (ABTSA) was also formed.

In May 1965 Issue 1 of Volume 1 of The Arboricultural Association Journal was published. In this year the AA was also involved in developing new tree-relaed standards and documents including BS3936:1965 Nursery Stock - Trees and Shrubs; BS3998:1966 Recommendations for Tree Work" and BS4043:1966 Semi-Mature Trees. The first AA Advisory Leaflet "Tree Preservation Orders" is also published.

In 1974 at the Arboricultural Annual Conference at Merrist Wood College, the AA and ABTSA formally merged to become the "new" AA incorporating ABTSA. Don Wells reported that the Scottish Branch had been very active since 1971. He further reported that "a Register of Consultants has been drawn up and well established" and that the AA were involved in preparation of British Standards for "Extra Heavy Trees" and "Tree Roots and Construction".

References

External links 
 The Arboricultural Association

1964 establishments in the United Kingdom
Charities based in Gloucestershire
Forestry education
Forestry in the United Kingdom
Forestry occupations
Forestry organizations
Trade associations based in the United Kingdom
Organizations established in 1964
Stroud District